The Norma Cluster (ACO 3627 or Abell 3627) is a rich cluster of galaxies located near the center of the Great Attractor; it is about  distant. Although it is both nearby and bright, it is difficult to observe because it is located in the Zone of Avoidance, a region near the plane of the Milky Way. Consequently, the cluster is severely obscured by interstellar dust at optical wavelengths. Its mass is estimated to be on the order of 1015 solar masses.

ESO 137-001, an example of a jellyfish galaxy, is located in Abell 3627.

See also
 List of galaxy groups and clusters
 Coma Cluster
 Eridanus Cluster
 Fornax Cluster
 Virgo Cluster
 X-ray astronomy

References

External links
 ESO Press Photos 46a-j/99
 
 Galaxy Cluster Has Two 'Tails' to Tell. NASA Image of the Day, January 22, 2010.
 The clickable Norma Cluster

 
Pavo-Indus Supercluster
Great Attractor
3627
Abell richness class 1